is a former professional tennis player from Japan.

Biography
Kato was based in Switzerland from an early age. During his junior career he was friends with Roger Federer and partnered with him in several doubles tournaments. He beat Federer in a national under-12s final.

Turning professional in 1998, Kato made his first appearance in an ATP Tour tournament that year, the doubles at the Swiss Open Gstaad with Marco Chiudinelli. He was twice given a wildcard entry into the men's doubles draw at the Japan Open, the first in 2002, when partnered with Gouichi Motomura to reach the quarter-finals. On the other occasion, in 2003, he and Satoshi Iwabuchi upset the top seeded pairing of Wayne Arthurs and Paul Hanley in the first round, en route to the semi-finals.

In 2003 he won two Challenger doubles titles, on hard courts in Togliatti and Valladolid.

Kato represented the Japan Davis Cup team in 2003, for a tie against India in New Delhi. He played the doubles rubber with Thomas Shimada, which they lost to Mahesh Bhupathi and Leander Paes. In the reverse singles he was beaten by Rohan Bopanna.

He featured in the main draw of the men's doubles at the 2004 French Open, with Stephen Huss, for a first round exit, to Russians Igor Andreev and Nikolay Davydenko.

Challenger titles

Doubles: (2)

See also
List of Japan Davis Cup team representatives

References

External links
 
 
 

1980 births
Living people
Japanese male tennis players
Sportspeople from Yokohama
Japanese expatriate sportspeople in Switzerland